Anders Eriksson (born 14 May 1973) is a Swedish enduro rider and a seven-time World Enduro Champion. He debuted in the World Enduro Championship with Kawasaki in 1991, and took his first world title with Husaberg in the 350 cc class in 1995. He then moved to Husqvarna for the 1996 season, and won the 400 cc world championship. In 2010, Eriksson was named an FIM Legend for his motorcycling achievements.

Debuting in the 500 cc category, Eriksson finished second to Kari Tiainen, and then beat him to the title in 1998 and 1999, despite not matching the Finn's win totals. After a third place in 2000, Eriksson edged Mika Ahola by one point to take his fifth world title in 2001. After winning the 500 cc world championship for the fourth time in 2002, he moved to the smaller 450 cc class for the 2003 season and became a seven-time world champion, equalling Tiainen's record. Eriksson continued with Husqvarna until the 2008 season, when he signed to the BMW team with a contract that runs through 2010.

Career summary

ISDE

References

External links 

 

1973 births
Living people
Enduro riders
Swedish motorcycle racers